Maxim Monguzhukovich Munzuk ((2 May 1910 – 28 July 1999 in Kyzyl, Tyva, Russia) was a Tuvan actor, one of the founders of the Republic of Tuva's regional theatre. He is best known for playing the title role in Akira Kurosawa's film Dersu Uzala.

The versatile and creative Munzuk was an actor, director, singer, collector of musical folklore, composer, and teacher. Originally a musician in the military, Munzuk served as the commander of Tyva’s Artillery Regiment orchestra.  He founded the Tuvan musical-drama theatre in the 1930s and played a huge number of roles of the most varied characters.

Akira Kurosawa picked Munzuk as the lead in his Soviet-financed epic Dersu Uzala (1975), along with Yuri Solomin as writer-explorer Vladimir Arsenyev on whose 1923 book the film was based. Munzuk's impressive acting contributed greatly to the film’s international success — the picture won the 1975 Academy Award as Best Foreign Picture.

He was awarded the titles of People's Artist of the RSFSR and of the Tuvan ASSR, and was also awarded the State Prize of the Republic of Tuva.

In 2004, the government of Tuva funded a prize for Best Actor named after Munzuk, awarded annually at a national competition; the same year, the Dersu Uzala Foundation was inaugurated, also named in Munzuk’s memory and intended to support Tuvinian artists.

Filmography
 Loss of the Witness (Пропажа свидетеля) (1971, Detective) as Tykhe
 Dersu Uzala (Дерсу Узала) (1975, Adventures) as Dersu Uzala
 Preliminary Investigation (Предварительное расследование) (1978)
 Siberiade (1979) as Fedyka
 A Walk Worthy of Men (Прогулка, достойная мужчин) (1979, Film-story)
 On the Lord's Track (По следу властелина) (1979, Adventures)
 Last Hunting (Последняя охота) (1980, Drama history)
 Valentine (Валентина) (1981, Melodrama) as Ilya Eremeyev - an Evenk-hunter
 Revenge (Месть) (1989, Historical / Biographic)
 Pod severnym siyaniyem (1990) as Old Niyako (final film role)

References

External links
 
 Charity Foundation "Dersu Uzala" named Maxim Munzuk 
 Dersu Uzala Info

1910 births
1999 deaths
People from Tuva
Tuvan people
Russian male film actors
People's Artists of Russia
20th-century Russian male actors
Soviet male actors